was a Japanese actor. Starting as a stage actor in the 1950s, he also worked in film and television and was active until the time of his death. From the 1970s he starred in several of Yukio Ninagawa's productions, including an acclaimed role as Macbeth. Described as "Japan's best Shakespearean actor", Hira received several awards throughout his career, including an excellence award at the 2011  hosted by the Japanese government's Agency for Cultural Affairs.

Biography

Early life
Hira was born in Hiroshima, Hiroshima Prefecture, Japan. One of his early roles was in a production of Goethe's Faust.

Acting career
Hira's television debut in the 1963 series Three Outlaw Samurai, in which he played a nihilistic masterless samurai, saw his popularity rise. In 1968 he played Hamlet with the Shiki Theatre Company, a role which received very high reviews.

Performance style
Hira's stage performances were heralded throughout his career. In 2009, Tokyo University professor emeritus of English literature  described Hira as Japan's best Shakesperean actor, noting the incandescence he brought to his roles as mythical characters. The range in his performance as King Lear, from solemnness to madness, was praised by Kindai University professor and theatre critic . An obituary by the Chunichi Shimbun identified Hira's special ability to deliver profound performances and his high-toned delivery of lines.

Personal life
Hira married actress Yoshiko Sakuma in 1970 and they had a son, Takehiro, who was born in 1974 and is also an actor. The pair divorced in 1984. In 1998 Hira received a Medal of Honour from the Japanese government and in 2005 he was appointed to the Order of the Rising Sun, 4th Class.

Death
On October 23, 2016, he died at his home in Setagaya, Tokyo at the age of 82. At the time of his death he had a role in Fuji Television's Monday night drama Cain and Abel, which was taken over by Akira Terao. Hira's final performance, in the second episode of Cain and Abel, was filmed on 29 September and aired on 24 October, shortly after his death. Hira also had a role in NHK's production of Moribito: Guardian of the Spirit. Filming of the second season finished earlier in 2016 and premiered in January 2017. In the third season, which premiered in November 2017, Hira was replaced by Takeshi Kaga.

Filmography

Film

Television

Theater 
Antony and Cleopatra
Cyrano de Bergerac
Faust
Hamlet
Iliad
King Lear
Macbeth
Medea
The Merchant of Venice
NINAGAWA Macbeth
Oedipus Rex
Othello
Richard III
Rokumeikan
The Tempest
The Threepenny Opera
Twelfth Night
The Winter's Tale

Dubbing roles 
Atlantis: The Lost Empire (2001) – King Kashekim Nedakh

Awards and honours

Awards
2008: Asahi Performing Arts Awards - Artist Award (for his performances in King Lear and Yama no Kyojintachi)

Honours
Medal of Honour with Purple Ribbon (1998)
Order of the Rising Sun, 4th Class, Gold Rays with Rosette (2005)

References

External links
 Official profile 

1933 births
2016 deaths
Japanese male stage actors
Actors from Hiroshima Prefecture
Taiga drama lead actors
Recipients of the Medal with Purple Ribbon
Recipients of the Order of the Rising Sun, 4th class